School Gyrls is the debut album by American girl group School Gyrls, released in the United States on March 23, 2010. It peaked at No. 118 on the Billboard 200 and topped the Billboard Top Heatseekers chart. It was preceded by the singles "Something Like a Party", "I'm Not Just a Girl" and "Get Like Me".

Background
After their own School Gyrls movie, the group released their debut album. Although no promotion was carried out and all of the singles failed to chart, the album was still released and charted on the Billboard 200. It was only released in the U.S. and has not been planned to be released elsewhere.

Track listing
"Something Like a Party" – 4:21
"Detention" – 2:40
"What Goes Around" – 2:48
"Just a Kiss" – 2:54
"Something About Him" – 2:29
"I'm Not Just a Girl" – 3:22
"Extra Extra" – 3:15
"Get Like Me Feat. Mariah Carey" – 3:15
"Uncool" – 3:03
"Cheater" – 3:48
"Operator" (iTunes bonus track) – 3:22

Charts

Release history

References

External links
School Gyrls at SchoolGyrls.com

School Gyrls albums
2010 debut albums
Island Records albums